Dry blenders are a type of industrial mixer which are typically used to blend multiple dry components until they are homogeneous. Often minor liquid additions are made to the dry blend to modify the product formulation. Blending times using dry ingredients are often short (15–30 minutes) but are somewhat dependent upon the varying percentages of each component, and the difference in the bulk densities of each.

Types
Ribbon, paddle, tumble and vertical blenders are available. Many products including pharmaceuticals, foods, chemicals, fertilizers, plastics, pigments, and cosmetics are manufactured in these designs.

Sizes
Dry blenders range in capacity from half-cubic-foot laboratory models to 500-cubic-foot production units. A wide variety of horsepower-and-speed combinations and optional features such as sanitary finishes, vacuum construction, special valves and cover openings are offered by most manufacturers.

See also
 Industrial mixer

External links
 Dry Blender Selection Criteria Technical Paper

Industrial machinery